Adolphe Bartels (1802–1862) was a Belgian liberal, journalist and writer, notable for supporting the Belgian Revolution of 1830. He wrote two historical accounts of the Revolution, in 1834 and 1836 respectively. He also edited Radical, the liberal movement's official journal from 1837 to 1838.

Works
Les Flandres et la révolution belge
Documens historiques sur la révolution belge

External links
Varda Furman,  Belgian neo-babouvism (1830–1839): A revolutionary experience entangled in its rhetoric (abstract)

1802 births
1862 deaths
People of the Belgian Revolution